Magliaso railway station is a railway station in the municipality of Magliaso in the Swiss canton of Ticino. The station is on the metre gauge Lugano–Ponte Tresa railway (FLP), between Lugano and Ponte Tresa.

The station has a passing loop, with two side platforms. It was rebuilt in 1979, in collaboration with the PTT.

Services 
 the following services stop at Magliaso:

References

External links 
 

Magliaso
Ferrovie Luganesi stations